Shanthi Arvind (born 17 February 1980), also known as Santhi or Shanthi Master, is an Indian dancer and actress. She began her career at the age of 10 in the film Kizhakku Vaasal (1990) as a dancer. She is also known for being the title song dancer in the serial Metti Oli. 

Shanthi made her television debut in the 2002 television series Metti Oli, which proved to be a major breakout role in her career, she later earned her self the name of "Metti Oli Shanthi" after her appearance in the show. She also appeared in other television serials as an actress such as Kannana Kanne, Muthuzhagu and Kula Deivam.

Filmography

Television

Film

References

1980 births
Living people
Indian actresses
Actresses from Chennai
Indian film choreographers
Indian women choreographers
Indian choreographers
Dancers from Tamil Nadu
Actresses in Tamil cinema
Actresses in Tamil television
21st-century Indian actresses
Bigg Boss (Tamil TV series) contestants